Esau is the elder son of Isaac in the Hebrew Bible. He is mentioned in the Book of Genesis and by the prophets Obadiah and Malachi. The Christian New Testament alludes to him in the Epistle to the Romans and in the Epistle to the Hebrews.

According to the Hebrew Bible, Esau is the progenitor of the Edomites and the elder brother of Jacob, the patriarch of the Israelites. Jacob and Esau were the sons of Isaac and Rebecca, and the grandsons of Abraham and Sarah. Of the twins, Esau was the first to be born with Jacob following, holding his heel. Isaac was sixty years old when the boys were born.

Esau, a "man of the field", became a hunter who had "rough" qualities that distinguished him from his twin brother. Among these qualities were his redness and noticeable hairiness. Jacob was a plain or simple man, depending on the translation of the Hebrew word tam (which also means "relatively perfect man"). Jacob's color was not mentioned. Throughout Genesis, Esau is frequently shown as being supplanted by his younger twin, Jacob (Israel).

According to the Muslim tradition, the prophet Yaqub or Israel was the favorite of his mother, and his twin brother Esau was the favorite of his father prophet Ishaq, and he is mentioned in the "Story of Ya'qub" in Qisas al-Anbiya.

In Genesis

Birth
Genesis 25:25 narrates Esau's birth, "Now the first came forth red, all over like a hairy garment; and they named him Esau." The meaning of the word esau itself is not entirely certain. Others have noted the similarity to Arabic ’athaa (عثا) meaning "hirsute". The name Edom is also attributed to Esau, meaning "red" (Heb:  `admoni); the same color used to describe the color of the hairs of Esau. Genesis parallels his redness to the "red lentil pottage" that he sold his birthright for. Esau became the progenitor of the Edomites in Seir.

Birthright

In Genesis, Esau returned to his twin brother Jacob, famished from the fields. He begs Jacob to give him some "red pottage" (a play on his nickname,  `Edom, meaning "red".) This refers to his red hair. Jacob offers Esau a bowl of lentil stew in exchange for Esau's birthright ( bəḵōrāh, the right to be recognized as firstborn son with authority over the family), and Esau agrees. Thus Jacob acquires Esau's birthright. This is the origin of the English phrase "to sell one's birthright for a mess of pottage".

In , Jacob uses deception, motivated by his mother Rebekah, to lay claim to his blind father Isaac's blessing that was inherently due to the firstborn, Esau.

In , Rebekah is listening while Isaac speaks to his son Esau. When Esau goes to the field to hunt for venison to bring home, Rebekah says to her son Jacob, "Behold, I heard thy father speak to thy brother Esau, saying: 'Bring me venison and prepare a savoury food, that I may eat, and bless thee before the Lord before my death. Rebekah then instructs Jacob in an elaborate deception through which Jacob pretends to be Esau, in order to steal from Esau his blessing from Isaac and his inheritance—which in theory Esau had already agreed to give to Jacob. Jacob follows through with the plan to steal his brother's birthright by bringing the meal his father Isaac requested and pretending to be Esau. Jacob pulled off his disguise by covering himself in hairy lamb skin so that when his blind father went to touch him, his smooth skin did not give him away as an imposter of his hairy brother. Jacob successfully received his father Isaac's blessing. As a result, Jacob became the spiritual leader of the family after Isaac's death and the heir of the promises of Abraham.

When Esau learns of his brother's thievery, he is livid and begs his father to undo the blessing. Isaac responds to his eldest son's plea by saying that he only had one blessing to give and that he could not reverse the sacred blessing. Esau is furious and vows to kill Jacob. Once again Rebekah intervenes to save her younger son from being murdered by his elder twin brother, Esau.

Therefore, at Rebekah's urging, Jacob flees to a distant land to work for his uncle Laban. Jacob does not immediately receive his father's inheritance after the impersonation aimed at taking it from Esau. Having fled for his life, Jacob has left the wealth of Isaac's flocks, land and tents in Esau's hands. Jacob is forced to sleep out on the open ground and then work for wages as a servant in Laban's household. Jacob, who had deceived and cheated his brother, is in turn deceived and cheated by his uncle. Jacob asks to marry Laban's daughter Rachel, whom he has met at the well, and Laban agrees, if Jacob will give him seven years of service. Jacob does so, but after the wedding finds that beneath the veil is not Rachel but Leah, Laban's elder daughter. He agrees to work another seven years and Jacob and Rachel are finally wed. However, despite Laban, Jacob eventually becomes so rich as to incite the envy of Laban and Laban's sons.

 tells of Jacob's and Esau's eventual reconciliation. Jacob sends multiple waves of gifts to Esau as they approach each other, hoping that Esau will spare his life. Esau refuses the gifts, as he is now very wealthy and does not need them. Jacob never apologizes to Esau for his actions; Jacob nevertheless bows down before Esau and insists on his receiving the gifts. Esau shows forgiveness in spite of this bitter conflict.  (After this, God confirms his renaming of Jacob as "Israel".)

Jacob's deception
Genesis Chapter 27 verse 16 of the King James Version Bible:  "And she put the skins of the kids of the goats upon his hands and upon the smooth of his neck:"
Verse 19:  "And Jacob said unto his father, I am Esau thy firstborn; I have done according as thou badest me: arise, I pray thee, sit and eat of my venison, that thy soul may bless me."
Verse 22-23: "And Jacob went near unto Isaac his father; and he felt him, and said, The voice is Jacob's voice, but the hands are the hands of Esau. And he discerned him not, because his hands were hairy, as his brother Esau's hands: so he blessed him."

Family
 describes Esau's marriage at the age of forty to two Canaanite women: Judith the daughter of Beeri the Hittite, and Basemath the daughter of Elon the Hittite. This arrangement grieved his parents. Upon seeing that his brother was blessed and that their father rejected Esau's union to Canaanites, Esau went to the house of his uncle Ishmael and married his cousin, Mahalath the daughter of Ishmael, and sister of Nebajoth. Some scholars equate the three wives mentioned in Genesis 26 and 28 with those in Genesis 36. Casting his lot with the Ishmaelites, he was able to drive the Horites out of Mount Seir to settle in that region. According to some views Esau is considered to be the progenitor not only of the Edomites but of the Kenizzites and the Amalekites as well.

Esau had five sons:
 By Adah: Eliphaz
 By Aholibamah: Jeush, Jaalam, Korah
 By Basemath: Reuel

Family tree

Other references

Minor prophet references
Esau was also known as Edom, the progenitor of the Edomites who were established to the south of the Israelites. They were an ancient enemy nation of Israel. The minor prophets, such as Obadiah, claim that the Edomites participated in the destruction of the First Temple by Nebuchadnezzar in 587 BC. Exactly how the Edomites participated is not clear. Psalm 137 ("By the waters of Babylon") suggests merely that Edom had encouraged the Babylonians: The Lord is asked to "remember against the Edomites the day of Jerusalem, how they said 'raze it, raze it to its foundations'". But the prophecy of Obadiah insists on the literal "violence done" by Esau "unto your brother Jacob" when the Edomites "entered the gate of my people..., looted his goods..., stood at the parting of the ways to cut off the fugitive,... delivered up his survivors on his day of distress".

By the intertestamental period, Edom had replaced Babylon as the nation that actually burned the Temple ("Thou hast also vowed to build thy temple, which the Edomites burned when Judah was laid waste by the Chaldees").

New Testament references
 depicts Esau as unspiritual for thoughtlessly throwing away his birthright.  states "Jacob I loved, but Esau I hated," based upon , although this passage goes on to depict the nations of Israel (Jacob) and Edom (Esau).

In Islamic tradition

According to Islamic scholars, the prophet Ayyub was the great grandson of Esau's son Reuel.

Rabbinic Jewish sources 

The Targum Pseudo-Jonathan connects the name Esau to the Hebrew asah, stating, "because he was born fully completed, with hair of the head, beard, teeth, and molars." Other traditional sources connect the word with the Hebrew šāv` meaning "worthless".

Jewish commentaries have shed a negative view on Esau because of his rivalry with Jacob, and likewise viewed the apparent reconciliation between the brothers described in Genesis 32–33 as insincere, on Esau's part. The Midrash says that during Rebekah's pregnancy whenever she would pass a house of Torah study, Jacob would struggle to come out; whenever she would pass a house of idolatry, Esau would agitate to come out.

He is considered to be a rebellious son who kept a double life until he was 15, when he sold his birthright to Jacob. According to the Talmud, the sale of the birthright took place immediately after Abraham died. The Talmudic dating would give both Esau and Jacob an age of 15 at the time. The lentils Jacob was cooking were meant for his father Isaac, because lentils are the traditional mourner's meal for Jews.  On that day before returning, in a rage over the death of Abraham, Esau committed five sins; he raped a betrothed young woman, he committed murder (Nimrod), he denied God, he denied the resurrection of the dead, and he spurned his birthright.

Haman's lineage is given in the Targum Sheni as follows: "Haman the son of Hammedatha the Agagite, son of Srach, son of Buza, son of Iphlotas, son of Dyosef, son of Dyosim, son of Prome, son of Ma'dei, son of Bla'akan, son of Intimros, son of Haridom, son of Sh'gar, son of Nigar, son of Farmashta, son of Vayezatha, (son of Agag, son of Sumkei,) son of Amalek, son of the concubine of Eliphaz, firstborn son of Esau".

According to Rashi, Isaac, when blessing Jacob in Esau's place, smelled the heavenly scent of Gan Eden (Paradise) when Jacob entered his room and, in contrast, perceived Gehenna opening beneath Esau when the latter entered the room, showing him that he had been deceived all along by Esau's show of piety. In Jewish folklore, the Roman Emperor Titus was a descendant of Esau.

Death

According to the Babylonian Talmud, Esau was killed by Hushim, son of Dan, son of Jacob, because Esau obstructed the burial of Jacob into the cave of Machpelah. When Jacob was brought to be buried in the cave, Esau prevented the burial, claiming he had the right to be buried in the cave; after some negotiation Naphtali was sent to Egypt to retrieve the document stating Esau sold his part in the cave to Jacob. Hushim (who was hard of hearing) did not understand what was going on, and why his grandfather was not being buried, so he asked for an explanation; after being given one he became angry and said: "Is my grandfather to lie there in contempt until Naphtali returns from the land of Egypt?" He then took a club and killed Esau, and Esau's head rolled into the cave. This means that the head of Esau is also buried in the cave.

Jewish sources state that Esau sold his right to be buried in the cave. According to Shemot Rabbah, Jacob gave all his possessions to acquire a tomb in the Cave of the Patriarchs. He put a large pile of gold and silver before Esau and asked, “My brother, do you prefer your portion of this cave, or all this gold and silver?” Esau's selling to Jacob his right to be buried in the Cave of the Patriarchs is also recorded in Sefer HaYashar.

Jubilees
In the Book of Jubilees, Esau's father, Isaac, compels Esau to swear not to attack or kill Jacob after Isaac has died. However, after the death of Isaac, the sons of Esau convince their father to lead them, and hired mercenaries, against Jacob in order to kill Jacob and his family and seize their wealth (especially the portion of Isaac's wealth that Isaac had left to Jacob upon his death). "Then Ya'aqov bent his bow and sent forth the arrow and struck Esau, his brother on his right breast and slew him (Jubilees 38:2) . . . Ya'aqov buried his brother on the hill which is in Aduram, and he returned to his house (Jubilees 38:9b)."

Reputed grave on the West Bank 
South of the Palestinian town of Sa'ir on the West Bank there is a tomb reputed to be that of Esau – El 'Ais in his Arab name.

The PEF's Survey of Western Palestine (SWP) wrote: 

The SWP stated this identification was false and that Esau's tomb was in the Biblical Mount Seir.

Gallery

Notes

References

Bibliography

External links

 Esau at the Jewish Encyclopedia
 

 
Edom
Jacob
Biblical twins
Book of Genesis people
Nimrod
Hunters
Book of Jubilees